Freightliner may refer to:

 Freightliner Trucks, a heavy vehicle brand of Daimler AG
 Freightliner Group, a European rail-freight operator
 Freight liner (ship), describing a cargo ship operating to a repeating schedule

See also

Freight
 Freighter (disambiguation)
 Liner (disambiguation)
 Line (disambiguation)